Steve Toll (born June 16, 1974 in St. Catharines, Ontario) is a former lacrosse player and current executive in the Canadian Lacrosse League. In his 14-year National Lacrosse League career, Toll won five NLL Championships four with the Toronto Rock and one with the Rochester Knighthawks. He was a transition specialist, and in 2007 was awarded the first ever National Lacrosse League Transition Player of the Year Award.

In October 2011, Toll announced that he was retiring from the NLL to become the Director of Operations for the Durham and Oshawa franchises of the new Canadian Lacrosse League (CLax).

Junior career
Toll had one of the greatest junior lacrosse careers in St. Catharines Athletics history. Toll would finish his five-year tenure with the A's as the all time leader in assists (355) and points (607) (regular season and playoffs combined).

Hockey career
Toll played ice hockey and lacrosse for Rochester Institute of Technology; he was named the NCAA Division III Men's Ice Hockey Player of the Year in 1997.  Toll also played professional hockey in the East Coast Hockey League and Central Hockey League.

Statistics

NLL
Reference:

OLA

Awards

References

External links

1974 births
Living people
Canadian lacrosse players
Colorado Mammoth players
Edmonton Rush players
Lacrosse transitions
National Lacrosse League All-Stars
National Lacrosse League major award winners
RIT Tigers men's ice hockey players
Rochester Institute of Technology alumni
Rochester Knighthawks players
San Jose Stealth players
Sportspeople from St. Catharines
Toronto Rock players